Okey Wali, SAN (born October 29, 1958) is a Nigerian lawyer and the 26th president of the Nigerian Bar Association.

Early life
Wali was born on October 29, 1958 at Obio-Akpor local government area in the metropolis of Port Harcourt, a southern part of Nigeria.
He attended the Port Harcourt Township School for his primary education but completed it at St. Paul’s Primary School in Diobu, Port Harcourt.
He later attended Baptist High School, Port Harcourt, where he obtained the West African School Certificate in 1973 and proceeded to the University of Buckingham, United Kingdom, where he received a Bachelor of Law degree in 1983.
He returned to Nigeria for professional training at the Nigerian Law School in Lagos State and was called to the Nigerian Bar in 1984.

Law career
He was called to the Nigerian Bar in 1984.
After few years of working experience, he was appointed as secretary of Port Harcourt branch of the NBA in 1992.
He later served as the Attorney-General and Commissioner for Justice of Rivers State before he was elected as the 26th president of the Nigerian Bar Association, having polled 688 votes to defeat Emeka Ngige (SAN), who had 449 votes.
He was succeeded by Augusustine Alegeh, a senior advocate of Nigeria.

Controversy
In October 2014, it was reported that Wali was abducted in Rumualogu Town, Akpor City, Rivers State by unknown gunmen and released a few days after the abduction.

References

Living people
1958 births
Senior Advocates of Nigeria
Attorneys General of Rivers State
Rivers State lawyers
Rivers State Commissioners of Justice
Alumni of the University of Buckingham
People from Obio-Akpor